Yaakov Yitzchak Horowitz may refer to:

 Yaakov Yitzchak of Lublin (c. 1745 – 1815), Polish rabbi known as the "Seer of Lublin"
 Yaakov Yitchak Horowitz (born 1956), American rabbi associated with the Manischewitz kosher food company